All German nouns are included in one of three grammatical genders: masculine, feminine or neuter. However, the gender is not relevant to the plural forms of nouns.

In German, it is useful to memorize nouns with their accompanying definite article in order to remember their gender. However, for about 80% of nouns, the grammatical gender can be deduced from their singular and plural forms and their meaning.

Noun forms 
Derivational suffixes in particular, together with most noun endings, consistently relate with specific genders, and there are very few frequent exceptions to this (as reflected in the first column). Nevertheless, the details in the second column are not solid rules, and their irregularities should be noted.

Notes: exceptions and irregularities

Noun meanings 
The gender of many nouns can be seen by their meaning. However, in almost all circumstances, the rules in the paragraph above override those given here.

Notes for the chart:

Special cases 
The genders of a few nouns are not fixed, and may be linked to regional or register differences. There are a number of words with two meanings distinguished by gender.

Compounds and abbreviations 
Compound words usually carry the gender of their last element. Moreover, the gender of abbreviations is decided by the base word, and shortened words act as the gender of the full word.

English loanwords 
Many loanwords from English adopt the gender of their native German equivalent; the gender of other loanwords may be deduced by the word's form or ending. For example, nouns from English -ing forms are neuter when referring to actions, but masculine when not referring to actions e.g. der Looping, 'loop' esp. in context of a rollercoaster. Another source of neuter loanwords are adverbials like das Off.

Monosyllabic nouns from verbs 
Monosyllabic nouns from verbs are often masculine, and the same goes for monosyllabic words for which there is no other indication, which are mainly masculine.

Varying gender 
In many cases the gender can vary, either because of regional differences or because the noun's gender is not firmly established.

Professions 

Most job titles have both a masculine and feminine form, to reflect the gender of the professional, similar to the English distinction between "waiter" and "waitress". Feminine job titles are usually created by adding -in to the grammatically masculine word in question. This yields the feminine form .

See also 
 German articles
 German cases
 German nouns

Notes

References

Sources

Further reading

External links 
 Identifying a German Word’s Gender, For Dummies (on the Internet Archive).
 Some Hints on How to Guess Gender, University of Michigan College of LSA (on the Internet Archive).
 Gender of Nouns , Practical German.
Grammatical gender
German grammar